Kuči (alternatively, Kuçi in Albanian) is a historical tribe (pleme) of Albanian origin and a region in central and eastern Montenegro, north-east of Podgorica, extending along the border with Albania. Its historical center is the village of Medun.

The name "Kuči" first appears in historical record in 1330 in an anthroponym from an Albanian katun which was under the jurisdiction of the Dečani Monastery. The region itself is first mentioned in 1485 as a nahiyah of the Sandjak of Shkodra. Over time, several waves of settlers came to populate the region and form the historical community of Kuči. The region is known for its resistance against Ottoman rule and its key role in the creation of modern Montenegro. Until the 17th century, the Kuči region was equally Orthodox and Catholic. Today, it is mostly Orthodox except for the Catholic community of Koja. Muslim converts appear since 1485. In the 17th and 18th centuries, both voluntarily and non-voluntarily many people from the pleme began to settle in the Plav-Gusinje, Rožaje and the wider Sandžak region. Many of their descendants identify as Muslim Bosniaks.

The history of the people of Kuči represents the diversity of the area and its location at the crossroads between different cultures and religions. Marko Miljanov (1833-1901), a national hero of Montenegro who led the tribe in the Montenegrin-Ottomans Wars in 1861–62 and 1876–78, Jakup Ferri (1832-1879), a national hero of Albania who fought against Miljanov's annexation of his home territory Plav to Montenegro and Muamer Zukorlić, a modern Bosniak politician in the Sandžak are all from Kuči.

Geography

Kuči is within the municipality of Podgorica and comprises almost the entirety of eastern Podgorica. Koja is part of Tuzi Municipality The unofficial centre is the Ubli village. It had 227 inhabitants in the 2011 Montenegrin census and houses several institutions like a culture hall, the "Đoko Prelević" elementary school, a hospital, police station, and a former fabric factory. Ubli is situated in central Kuči with the center and villages of Prelevići, Pavićevići, Živkovići, Kostrovići, etc. Other villages are: Medun, Orahovo, Fundina, Koći, Kržanja, Kosor, Vrbica, Stravče, Zagreda, Raći in northern Kuči and Doljani, Murtovina, Stara Zlatica, Zlatica in southern Kuči.

The Kuči region itself can be divided into two major historical sub-regions:
Old Kuči (Staro Kuči), Orthodox sub-tribe, which celebrates the Slava of Mitrovdan
Drekalovići (Novo Kuči), Orthodox sub-tribe, which celebrates the Slava of Nikoljdan

An area that is considered part of the wider Kuči region is Koja, a Catholic Albanian tribe. It is the last region of wider Kuči that became part of Montenegro in 1880. It includes the settlements of Koći, Fundina. The region of Koja stands between Triepshi in the south and Kuči proper in the north. The people of Koja are referred to as Kojanë.

Some villages stand between its sub-regions. For example, the village of Orahovo is situated between Old Kuči and Koja. Other settlements that were once part of one Kuči tribal region moved over time to another region.

Origins 

Of Albanian origin, Kuči underwent a process of gradual cultural integration into the neighbouring Slavic population. A Franciscan report of the 17th century illustrates the final stages of their acculturation. Its author writes that the Bratonožići, Piperi, Bjelopavlići and Kuči: nulla di meno essegno quasi tutti del rito serviano, e di lingua Illrica ponno piu presto dirsi Schiavoni, ch' Albanesi (since almost all of them use the Serbian rite and the Illyric (Slavic) language, soon they should be called Slavs, rather than Albanians).

The first time Kuči (known in the subgroupings of modern Kuči as Old Kuči) is mentioned in historical records is in 1330, in the second charter of the Dečani chrysobulls. There, it appears in the surname of Petar Kuč (Pjetër Kuç), an individual from the Albanian katun (Katun Arbanasa), possibly the leader of the Kuči tribe. The same Petar Kuč is mentioned again as the head of a household of the Albanian katun in the third charter of the Dečani monastery, which dates from 1343-1345. Contrary to most other villages mentioned in the Dečani chrysobulls, no indication is given on the location of the Albanian katun. Kuči is listed in the Venetian cadaster of 1416-7 of Shkodra, as a small village of eight households near the city itself. It was headed by a Jon Nada (a mistake from the scribe who wrote Nada instead of Nenada). Two other heads of households are sons of Nenad, Gjergj (Giergi in the original document) and Lazër (Lazzaro). A person married into the village is Jon Progani, who was married to Nesa (a diminutive of the name Nenada). His son, Gjin Progani was also a household head as were Jon Serapa and Gjergj Tina and Pali Samrishi. They paid one ducat per household in taxes to the Venetian governor of Scutari. Members of this brotherhood also lived in other villages in the area like in Shurdhani, where three out of six households were from Kuçi.

Up until the end of the 15th century, Kuči had not formed as a tribe. After 1479, the area came under Ottoman control. In the Ottoman defter of the Sanjak of Scutari in 1485, Kuči appears as a nahiye for the first time in its modern location. At this point, the nahiye of Kuči comprised communities that later formed two different administrative units and bajraks: Kuči and Triepshi. The total number of households in the eight settlements of the nahiya were 253. These (with household numbers in brackets) were: Pantalesh (110), Brokina (12), Bardhani (25), Radona (55), Bankeq (11), Stani (24), Bytidosi (11), Llazorçi (5). Llazorçi was a settlement of another small tribe, the Lazori who appear as part of the Albanian katun in 1330. By 1485, they had moved northwards with the Kuči brotherhoods. Bankeq and a part of Bytidosi are related with the historical region of Triepshi. In terms of anthroponymy the demographics of the area showed a cohabitation of Albanian and Slavic names. In the 253 households, 105 households heads had Albanian names, 53 had mixed Albanian-Slavic names and 91 had Slavic names. About 2/3 of the Slavic anthroponymy (59 households) was concentrated in two settlements, Radona and Stani. Radona also had about 1/5 of the mixed Slavic Orthodox-Albanian anthroponymy and it was the only settlement of Kuči in 1485 where Muslim converts lived (5/55 households).

The Old Kuči (Starokuči/Старокучи) were a community of diverse brotherhoods (clans), in relation to the Drekalovići who claimed ancestry from a single ancestor. J. Erdeljanović found, in the Old Kuči, very noticeable instances of the merging of various brotherhoods into one over time. The merging was so finalized that it was hard for him to mark off the parts of those composite brotherhoods, "even the searching in that direction was also encountered by the apprehension of said individuals". With the arrival of the Drekalovići, the old families called themselves "Old Kuči". All Old Kuči have as Saint Demetrius (Mitrovdan) as a patron saint - Slava.

In the next defter, it had 338 households in eleven settlements including new or renamed settlements like Pavlovići, Petrovići, Lješovići (Leshoviq), Lopari, Banjovići and Koći (Koja). This increase by 85 households in a few years represents a wave of refugees and other communities that settled in the area as the Ottomans were consolidating their power base. Pavlovići, Petrovići, Banjovići, which represent more than half of the new households have a predominantly Slavic Orthodox anthroponymy. Koći is the historical settlement of the Catholic Albanian Koja tribe that would fully form in later years. Leshoviq/Lješovići had come to the area from the Catholic Albanian Kelmendi tribe to the south of Kuči.

Another wave of settlement in the mid 16th century is that of the Drekalovići, who came to form an important part of Kuči. Originally, Catholic and Albanian-speaking, they trace their origin to the Berisha in northern Albania. They intermarry within Kuči, but form no marriage with Berisha or a large part of Kastrati, which traces their descent in turn from them. These three waves of settlement became the core of the Kuči tribe.

As the centuries passed, other families came to Kući as refugees of Ottoman expeditions or as fugitives from blood feuding. These form a much more recent and incidental form of settlement in the area. At the same time, brotherhoods that were from Kući left the area whether as refugees from Ottoman punitive campaigns or simply as emigrants and settled further north, mostly in the Sandzak area, where many converted to Islam in the 17th and 18th century. A part of Gashi tribe of Kosovo has in its tradition that it moved from the area of Kuçi to Gashi in the first half of the 17th century.

There also various oral traditions with varying degrees of consistency with archival records. In Montenegro, Marko Miljanov himself from Kuči wrote in his book about his home region that the Kuči and Berisha were "regarded close", allegedly because the Berisha ancestors settled from Kuči; Konstantin Jireček further recorded about this story that Old Kuči (Staro Kuči), which placed a Grča, son of Nenad as its ancestor also placed him as an ancestor of the Berisha tribe. On the contrary, in Berisha it is believed that Old Kuči itself descends from Berisha and is called Berisha i Kuq (Red Berisha) as opposed to Berisha of Pukë, Mërturi and a part of Piperi that traces its origin from Berisha, who are collectively called Berisha i Bardh (White Berisha). In historical record, Berisha and the Old Kuči appear in different areas and timelines as Old Kuči formed part of the tribe of current Kuči, which was based on different ancestral groups in the late 15th century . Nevertheless, if not kin by blood, Montenegrin and Albanian tribes regarded closeness in original or home territory from where someone "came". Therefore, Serbian geographer Andrija Jovićević put forward the narrative that the Kuči were "kin" to Kastrati, Berisha and Kelmendi because their distant ancestor once, ostensibly, settled in the same general area as Kuči.

Another late 19th century tradition, which J. Erdeljanović wrote down in Kuči, the most intricate versions of which were from Kržanj, Žikoviće, Kostroviće, Bezihovo, Kute, Podgrad and Lazorce. According to this story Old Kući descended from Gojko, the brother of King Vukašin. His descendants were forced to flee Shkodra with the Ottoman invasion and settled in Brštan. Gojko Mrnjavčevic, however, is a fictional character in Serb epic poetry, who dies in the 1371 Battle of Maritsa in folk tradition itself. Kuči itself is first attested before the feudal Mrnjavčević family as a semi-nomadic, pastoral community in the area around modern Tuzi in 1330.

As Kuči is in a transitional area between the Albanian and Slavic languages, it has become the subject of historiographical dispute. In particular, Serbian historiography has been criticized, as muting in the area Albanian and Slavic symbiosis and bilingualism in favor of a monoethnic and monolingual Serbian narrative, a trend evident in ethnographers of the early 20th century like Jovan Erdeljanović and Jovan Cvijić. Older Serbian or Yugoslav historiography and ethnography on the Kuči conflated the Ottoman nahiye of Kuči - an administrative unit composed of different communities - with the Kuči tribe. As such, the Albanian tribes that were within the nahiye and would later be administratively within Kuči following the incorporation of their lands into the Montenegrin state, such as Trieshi and Koja e Kuçit, were treated as branches or regions of the Kuči tribe despite their distinct histories and identities.

History

Ottoman
In a 1582/83 defter (Ottoman tax registry), the Kuči nahiya had 13 villages, belonging to the Sanjak of Scutari. In the villages of the nahiya, names were majority Slavic, although Albanian were very common as well. This period marks the time where Albanian toponymy begins to be either translated into Slavic or acquire Slavic suffixes like in the village of Bardhani that begins to appears as Bardič.  Administratively, the Kuči, Bratonožići and part of Plava were under the soldiers of Medun and its spahi, but the commander was not named. They were also subject to taxation, despite having some autonomy.

In 1610, the Kuči (Cucci) are mentioned by Marino Bizzi as being half Orthodox and half Catholic. In his report, Bolizza notes that Lale Drecalou (Lale Drekalov) and Nico Raizcou (Niko Rajckov) were the commanders of the Catholic Albanian Kuči (Chuzzi Albanesi) which had 490 households and 1,500 men-in-arms described as very war-like and courageous. This community had settled in the area of Kuči in the 16th century under Drekale's command.

In 1613, the Ottomans launched a campaign against the rebel tribes of Montenegro. In response, the tribes of the Vasojevići, Kuči, Bjelopavlići, Piperi, Kastrati, Kelmendi, Shkreli andi Hoti formed a political and military union known as “The Union of the Mountains” or “The Albanian Mountains” . The leaders swore an oath of besa to resist with all their might any upcoming Ottoman expeditions, thereby protecting their self-government and disallowing the establishment of the authority of the Ottoman Spahis in the northern highlands. Their uprising had a liberating character. With the aim of getting rid of the Ottomans from the Albanian territories

In 1614, Lale Drekalov was one of the chief participants and organizers of the assembly of Kuçi. In that assembly 44 leaders mostly from northern Albania and Montenegro took part to organize an insurrection against the Ottomans and ask for assistance by the Papacy. Gjon Renësi had undertaken the task of presenting the decisions of the assembly to the Papacy. The leaders who participated in the assembly also decided to send a proclamation to the kings of Spain and France claiming they were independent from Ottoman rule and did not pay tribute to the empire. It was followed by an assembly in Prokuplje in 1616 and another one in 1620 in Belgrade, where he appears as one of the participants. In this period they continue to appear as subjects of the Ottoman Empire. The political alliance in Europe did not allow for a coherent strategy to emerge in assistance of a pan-Balkan coalition against the Ottomans. In 1658, in another attempt to form an anti-Ottoman coalition the seven tribes of Kuči, Vasojevići, Bratonožići, Piperi, Kelmendi, Hoti and Gruda allied themselves with the Republic of Venice, establishing the so-called "Seven-fold barjak" or "alaj-barjak.

The first half of the 17th century is marked by an important event in the religious history of Kuči. Voivode Lale Drekalov, who was a Catholic, converted to Orthodoxy in his second marriage to a relative of the voivode of the Bratonožići tribe. The main reasons that have been put forward to explain this decision include his shift in orientation of political alliances towards the Orthodox tribes of Montenegro, the influence of the Orthodox Church in the region and the increasing disappointment towards the Catholic powers in Europe that were considered to have abandoned their allies in the Balkans. Drekalov's conversion was soon followed by a gradual conversion of all Catholics of Kuči. As Francesco Bolizza notes in a letter to Cardinal Caponi in 1649, about three or four Catholic villages remained in Kuči under the jurisdiction of the Franciscan mission of Gruda. According to Historians Simo Milutinović and Dimitrije Milaković, the Catholic Kuči, Bratonožići and Drekalovići tribe has converted to Orthodoxy by Rufim Boljević.

In 1688, the Kuči, with help from Kelmendi and Piperi, destroyed the army of Süleyman Pasha twice, took over Medun and got their hands of large quantities of weapons and equipment. In 1689, an uprising broke out in Piperi, Rovca, Bjelopavlići, Bratonožići, Kuči and Vasojevići, while at the same time an uprising broke out in Prizren, Peja, Prishtina and Skopje, and then in Kratovo and Kriva Palanka in October (Karposh's Rebellion).

In 1774, in the same month of the death of Šćepan Mali, Mehmed Pasha Bushati attacked the Kuči and Bjelopavlići, but was subsequently decisively defeated and returned to Scutari. Bushati had broken into Kuči and "destroyed" it; the Rovčani housed and protected some of the refugee families. 

In 1794, the Kuči and Rovčani were devastated by the Ottomans. In the 17th and 18th centuries many people from Kuči began to emigrate to urban centres in what is modern eastern Montenegro and the wider Sandzak area. Many of these converted to Islam over time and came to form an important part of the Muslim population in the regions of the Lower Kolašin, Plav, Rožaje, Sjenica and elsewhere.

Modern
 
The Ottoman increase of taxes in October 1875 sparked the Great Eastern Crisis, which included a series of rebellions, firstly with the Herzegovina Uprising (1875–77), which prompted Serbia and Montenegro declaring war on the Ottoman Empire (see Serbian–Ottoman War and Montenegrin–Ottoman War) and culminated with the Russians following suit (Russo-Turkish War). In Kuči, chieftain Marko Miljanov Popović organized resistance against the Ottomans and joined forces with the Montenegrins. The Kuči, identifying as a Serb tribe, asked to be united with Montenegro. After the Berlin Congress, Kuči was included into the borders of the Principality of Montenegro.

At the Battle of Novšiće, following the Velika attacks (1879), the battalions of Kuči, Vasojevići and Bratonožići fought the Albanian irregulars under the command of Ali Pasha of Gusinje, and were defeated.

Demographics
Like many rural areas in Montenegro and the Balkans in general, Kuči has suffered heavily from emigration since the collapse of Yugoslavia. The 2011 Montenegrin census recorded about 1,000 inhabitants in total in the villages traditionally associated with Kuči. Two major ethnic groups inhabit the region: ethnic Montenegrins and ethnic Serbs (see Montenegrin Serbs), though these may be regarded as one, as some families may politically be split between the two, i.e. with one brother opting for a Montenegrin identity and another a Serb. Most of the inhabitants are followers of the Serbian Orthodox Church, while a minority are ethnic Muslims. There is an enclave of Roman Catholic Albanians in the village of Koći (Koja in Albanian) and Fundina.

Christian Orthodox residents used to be split into two distinct groups: Old Kuči ("Starokuči") and Drekalovići/New Kuči. Mariano Bolizza in his voyage in the area in 1614 recorded that Lale Drekalov and Niko Raičkov held 490 houses of the Chuzzi Albanesi ("Albanian Kuči", a village of predominantly Roman Catholic religion), with 1,500 soldiers, described as "very war-like and courageous". The Drekalovići, the largest brotherhood of Kuči, numbered close to 800 households in 1941, roughly half of all of Kuči.
The Islamization of Kuči has made a minority of inhabitants declaring as simply Montenegrins, or Muslims by ethnicity, and Bosniaks although they trace the same origin with that of their Christian brethren.

The South Slavic dialect spoken in Kuči forms a speech group with Bratonožići and Piperi. South Slavic in these three communities is marked by close contact with the northern Albanian dialects of Malësia. This is especially apparent in the dialects of Kuči and Bratonožići, largely because of the historic bilingualism that was present in the area.

Culture
In terms of traditional customs, up to the end of the 19th century traces of a variant of the northern Albanian kanuns  remained in use in Kuči. Marie Amelie von Godin in her travels still reported traces of bilingualism in the area of Kuči. According to her reports, although Albanian was no longer spoken in the area, some laments  and oaths were still being sung and recited in Albanian.

People
born in Kuči
Lale Drekalov, vojvoda of the Kuči tribe, Drekale's son
Iliko Lalev, vojvoda of tribe, successor of his father, Lale
Radonja Petrović, vojvoda of the Kuči tribe.
Marko Miljanov (1833–1901), vojvoda, Montenegrin general and writer.
Mihailo Ivanović (1874–1949), Montenegrin politician
Bogdan Vujošević, Partisan

by descent
Vasa Čarapić (1768–1806), Serbian revolutionary
Ilija Čarapić, first Mayor of Belgrade
 Đorđe Čarapić, Serbian revolutionary
 Tanasije Čarapić, Serbian revolutionary
 Tom Čarapić, artist
Pavle Delibašić, Serbian footballer
Ejup Ganić, President of Bosnia and Herzegovina
Evgenije Popović, Montenegrin politician and journalist
Vuk Rašović, Serbian former football player and former manager of Partizan Belgrade, son of Branko Rašović
Duško Vujošević
Muamer Zukorlić, Bosniak politician
Fahrudin Radončić, Bosniak politician
Dženan Radončić, Montenegrin Bosniak fottballer
Jakup Kardović, commander of the Sandžak Muslim militia
Jakup Ferri, Albanian fighter
Shemsi Pasha, Ottoman Albanian general
Božina Ivanović, Yugoslav statesman
Dejan Radonjić, former basketball player and current coach
 Miljko Radonjić. Serbian writer.
Branislav Prelević, former Serbian and Greek basketball player
Đorđe Božović "Giška", notable Serbian gangster and paramilitary leader
Ratko Đokić "Kobra", Serbian-Swedish Mob boss
Branko Rašović, former Montenegrin football player
Bogdan Milić, Montenegrin footballer
Miroslav Vujadinović, Montenegrin footballer
Ante Miročević, former Montenegrin footballer
Vesna Milačić, Montenegrin singer and songwriter
Marina Kuč, Montenegrin swimmer
Suzana Lazović, Montenegrin handball player

Annotations

References

Sources

 

 
Historical regions in Montenegro
Tribes of Montenegro
Montenegrin people of Albanian descent